This was the first edition of the tournament.

Misaki Doi and Jessica Pegula won the title, defeating Taylor Johnson and Ashley Lahey in the final, 7–6(7–4), 6–3.

Seeds

Draw

Draw

References
Main Draw

Tennis Championships of Honolulu - Doubles
Tennis Championships of Honolulu